Julien El Fares (born 1 June 1985) is a French former professional road racing cyclist, who rode professionally between 2008 and 2021 for the , , ,  and  teams. During his career, he took three professional wins: the first stage of the 2009 Tirreno–Adriatico, the general classification at the 2009 Tour de Wallonie and the fourth stage of the 2010 Tour Méditerranéen.

Major results

2006
 5th Overall Ronde de l'Isard
 8th Overall Tour des Pyrénées
1st Stage 1
2007
 6th Liège–Bastogne–Liège U23
 7th Overall La Tropicale Amissa Bongo Ondimbo
 9th Overall Grand Prix du Portugal
2008
 7th Overall GP CTT Correios de Portugal
2009
 1st Overall Tour de Wallonie
 1st Stage 1 Tirreno–Adriatico
 4th Overall Circuit de la Sarthe
 5th Polynormande
2010
 3rd Overall Tour du Haut Var
 10th Overall Tour Méditerranéen
1st Stage 4
 10th Gran Premio dell'Insubria-Lugano
2011
 2nd Polynormande
 8th Overall Tour de Luxembourg
 9th Boucles de l'Aulne
 10th Grand Prix d'Ouverture La Marseillaise
 10th Grand Prix de Plumelec-Morbihan
2012
 2nd Overall Tour du Haut Var
 7th Route Adélie
 8th Boucles de l'Aulne
2013
 4th Overall Four Days of Dunkirk
 6th Classic Loire Atlantique
 7th Overall Tour de Luxembourg
 7th La Roue Tourangelle
 8th Klasika Primavera
 8th Paris–Camembert
2014
 5th Overall Tour of Hainan
2015
 2nd Paris–Troyes
 3rd Overall Tour of Hainan
1st  Mountains classification
 5th Classic Loire Atlantique
 6th Overall Boucles de la Mayenne
 7th Overall Tour du Haut Var
 7th Overall Tour of Yancheng Coastal Wetlands
 7th Boucles de l'Aulne
2016
 10th Overall Tour du Limousin
2017
 4th Grand Prix d'Ouverture La Marseillaise
 6th Overall Tour La Provence
 6th Boucles de l'Aulne
 10th Overall Tour du Haut Var
2018
 3rd Overall Tour of Hainan
2019
 3rd Boucles de l'Aulne
 4th Mont Ventoux Dénivelé Challenge
 5th Paris–Camembert
 7th Overall Tour du Haut Var
 7th Overall Tour de Luxembourg
 8th Grand Prix de Plumelec-Morbihan
 10th Overall Tour of Fuzhou
2020
 8th Overall Tour des Alpes-Maritimes et du Var
2021
 9th Grand Prix La Marseillaise

References

External links

Julien El Fares' profile on Cycling Base

French male cyclists
1985 births
Living people
People from Manosque
Sportspeople from Alpes-de-Haute-Provence
French sportspeople of Algerian descent
Cyclists from Provence-Alpes-Côte d'Azur